Newmarket (2021 population: 87,942) is a town and regional seat of the Regional Municipality of York in the Canadian province of Ontario. It is part of Greater Toronto in the Golden Horseshoe region of Southern Ontario. The name stems from the fact that the settlement was a "New Market",  in contrast to York as the Old Market.

The town was formed as one of many farming communities in the area, but also developed an industrial centre on the Northern Railway of Canada's mainline, which was built in 1853 through what would become the downtown area. It also became a thriving market town with the arrival of the Metropolitan Street Railway in 1899. Over time, the town developed into a primarily residential area, and the expansion of Ontario Highway 400 to the west and the construction of Ontario Highway 404 to the east increasingly turned it into a bedroom town since the 1980s. The province's Official Plan includes growth in the business services and knowledge industries, as well as in the administrative, manufacturing and retail sectors.

Landmarks include Upper Canada Mall, Southlake Regional Health Centre, the Main Street Heritage Conservation District, and Wesley Brooks Conservation Area (locally called "Fairy Lake Park" or "Fairy Lake").

History 
Newmarket's location on the Holland River enabled travel between Lake Ontario and Lake Simcoe. A portage route, the Toronto Carrying-Place Trail, ran one of its two routes up the Holland River through the Newmarket area, and over the Oak Ridges Moraine to the Rouge River and into Lake Ontario. A more widely used route ran up the western branch of the Holland River, over the moraine, and down the Humber River. In 1793, John Graves Simcoe travelled the trail northward along the main route to the west, and south to York (now Toronto) along the lesser used eastern route through Newmarket. Selecting the eastern route as the better of the two, Simcoe started construction of Yonge Street along the former trail in late 1795, starting in York in Toronto Bay, and ending at the newly named St. Albans (Holland Landing), north of Newmarket.

Early settlement
Quakers from the Thirteen Colonies moved to the area to avoid violence they were expected to take part in during the American Revolution. In June 1800, Timothy Rogers, a Quaker from Vermont, explored the area around the Holland River to find a suitable location for a new Quaker settlement. He, Samuel Lundy and their group of Religious Society of Friends received the grant of  around the Holland River. In 1801, Rogers returned along with several Quaker families who had left their homes in Vermont and Pennsylvania, and settled here between 1801 and 1803.

Joseph Hill constructed a mill on the river, damming it to produce a mill pond today known as Fairy Lake. The settlement of "Upper Yonge Street" developed around the mill and the Holland River. Hill also built a tannery north of the mill, the first general store and house, and additional mills.

In 1802, Elisha Beman, who owned land in the area, establish a mill, and then a distillery. Mordecai Millar also built mills, and Joseph Hill opened a tannery. During the War of 1812 a resident, William Roe, was hid the settlement's gold treasury from invading American troops. The war helped the settlement prosper, as the British army purchased goods and food and hired locals to build structures.

By 1814, the settlement had two frame and several log buildings used as residences. The settlement continued to grow through the early 19th century, along with the formation of Aurora and Holland Landing.  A post office opened in 1826, and until 1890 the name was spelled "New Market".

Newmarket is noted for its role in the Rebellions of 1837–1838, and was a centre of discontent against the manipulations of the governing Family Compact. Rebel leader William Lyon Mackenzie organized a series of meetings leading to the Rebellion; the first of which, on August 3, 1837, was delivered from the veranda of the North American Hotel in Newmarket. This speech contributed to the rebellion, as it was heard by about 600 farmers and others sympathetic to Mackenzie’s cause, who later that year armed themselves and marched down Yonge Street to take the capital. A number of leaders from this area were attainted for high treason, convicted and hanged.

By 1846, the population was about 600. Much of the settlement was built on the south side of the town, with farms surrounding it. There were six churches or chapels, a post office, five stores, three taverns, and tradesmen of various types. Industry included two grist-mills, two breweries, a distillery, one tannery, a foundry, a carding machine, and a cloth factory.

In June 1853, the first train pulled into Newmarket on the Toronto, Simcoe & Lake Huron Union Railroad, the first railway in Upper Canada. It was later called the Northern Railway of Canada, and carried passengers, agricultural products and manufactured goods. The line eventually linked Toronto to Collingwood on Georgian Bay, a major shipbuilding centre. Today, this line is the "Newmarket Subdivision" of the Canadian National Railway system, running north out of Newmarket towards Bradford, and south towards Toronto.

From village to town

Newmarket was incorporated as a village in 1857 with a population of 700, with Donald Sutherland as the first reeve. In 1858, Robert Simpson co-opened "Simpson & Trent Groceries, Boots, Shoes and Dry Goods" in downtown Newmarket, the first store in what would become the Simpsons department store chain. In 1880, Newmarket became a town with a population of 2,000. William Cane was elected as the first mayor. Some years later, his sash and door factory would become the first Canadian manufacturer of lead pencils, the Dixon Pencil Company.

In 1869, the population was 1,500 and a gazetteer described Newmarket as one of the most flourishing villages on the Northern Railway line. In addition to the train, stagecoaches were available to nearby communities. By the time of the 1871 census, the population was 1,760 and by 1881, it had increased to 2,006; an elementary school and a high school were already in operation by then.

The Toronto and York Radial Railway arrived in Newmarket in 1899. This service operated along Yonge Street south of Newmarket, but turned east to run through the downtown area along Main Street; it would later be extended north to Sutton. At the time, it brought significant numbers of day-trippers to Newmarket to shop at the market. Automobile traffic on Yonge Street, and the already existing mainline railway, had a significant effect on ridership, and the Radial was discontinued in the early 1930s.

North of Davis Drive in Newmarket, the East Holland River was straightened to prepare it for use as a commercial waterway to bypass the railway, whose prices were skyrocketing around the turn of the 20th century. Sir William Mulock, the local Member of Parliament, proposed a canal system running down the Holland River through Holland Landing and into Lake Simcoe. This would allow boats to connect from there to the Trent-Severn Waterway for eventual shipment south. The Newmarket Canal was almost complete by the summer of 1912, when it was cancelled by the incoming government of Robert Borden. Today, the locks are still visible and are known as the "Ghost Canal". The turning basin in downtown Newmarket was filled in and now forms the parking lot of The Old Davis Tannery Mall, on the site of the former Hill tannery.

Recent developments
For much of the 20th century, Newmarket developed along the east-west Davis Drive axis, limited to the area between Yonge Street on the west and between Bayview and Leslie Street in the east, and running from just north of Davis on the north to the Fairy Lake area on the south. By the 1950s, Newmarket was experiencing a suburban building boom due to its proximity to Toronto. The population increased from 5,000 to 11,000 between 1950 and 1970.

The Regional Municipality of York was formed in 1971, increasing the size of Newmarket with land from the Township of East Gwillimbury, from the Township of King and from the Township of Whitchurch. 
 The construction of Upper Canada Mall at the corner of Yonge Street and Davis Drive in 1974 started pulling the focal point of the town westward from the historic Downtown area along Main Street.

By the early 1980s, the historic Downtown area suffered as most businesses had built up in the area around Upper Canada Mall, with additional strip malls developing directly across the Yonge Street/Davis Drive intersection to the south and southeast. A concerted effort to revitalize the historic Downtown area during the late 1980s was successful. More recently, a $2.3-million investment was made by the town in 2004 in streetscaping and infrastructure improvements to roads and sidewalks in the historic Downtown. The historic area of Downtown's Main Street is once again a major focal point of the town.

The arrival of Highway 404 reversed the westward movement, pulling development eastward again, and surrounding the formerly separate hamlet of Bogarttown at the intersection of Mulock Drive and Leslie Street. Since then, Newmarket has grown considerably, filling out in all directions. The town limits now run from Bathurst Street in the west to Highway 404 in the east, and from just south of Green Lane to just north of St. John's Sideroad, taking over the former hamlet of Armitage at Yonge Street south of Mulock Drive. The southern boundary of the town is contiguous with Aurora to the south.

Armitage was the first settlement of King township, named in honour of its first settler Amos Armitage.

Other defunct communities once located within the modern boundaries of Newmarket include Garbut's Hill, Paddytown, Petchville, Pleasantville, and White Rose.

Geography 
Newmarket's geographical coordinates are 44.05°N, 79.46°W, and its elevation above sea level is 252 m. It has an area of 38.33 km². The town is bounded on the south by Aurora, on the west by King, on the north by East Gwillimbury and on the east by Whitchurch–Stouffville.

The main river in Newmarket is the East Holland River (known locally simply as "The Holland River"), and all other streams in the town are tributaries thereto. These include Bogart Creek, a brook that weaves its way into the town from the Oak Ridges Moraine by way of Bogarttown, emptying into the Holland River in north-central Newmarket; Western creek, another brook rising just west of the town, and reaching the Holland River in the town's north end; Tannery Creek, a stream that joins the Holland River in south Newmarket after flowing through Aurora; and a number of other small watercourses.

There are two reservoirs in Newmarket; Fairy Lake (which is managed by the Lake Simcoe Region Conservation Authority), a favourite recreational area in the centre of town, is a former mill pond on the East Holland River; and Bogart Pond, also a former mill pond, is fed and drained by Bogart Creek in Bogarttown. Furthermore, the water level in the reach of the East Holland north of Davis Drive is controlled from an unfinished Newmarket Canal lock, now used as a weir.

Newmarket also lies south of and above the Algonquin Shoreline, where elevations suddenly drop off from the gently rolling hills that characterize much of Newmarket to the much flatter, lower land down below in the Holland Marsh.

The land is characterized mainly by glacial deposits from the last ice age, known as "Newmarket Till". The town is underlain mainly by sand and gravel, ground by the icesheets that covered the area until about 10,000 years ago. No outcrops are to be found anywhere in Newmarket, so deep are the glacial deposits.

Planning 
Newmarket is identified as one of the Golden Horseshoe's 25 Urban Growth Centres in Ontario's Places to Grow Growth Plan.

Four areas of Newmarket have been selected to absorb the majority of planned population growth and accommodate mixed usages on sites well served by transit. These are the Yonge-Davis intersection, Yonge Street (south of Green Lane), the Regional Healthcare Centre (Southlake Regional Health Centre) and Historic Downtown Centre (surrounding Main Street South). Further construction of big box retail stores in the Yonge Street corridor will not be permitted and the long-term objective of the town is redevelopment or the addition of new buildings to these areas through controlled intensification.

The southwest portion of the town is located in the Oak Ridges Moraine and is therefore subject to the Ontario Government's Greenbelt Legislation.

Climate 
Newmarket has a humid continental climate (Köppen climate classification Dfb), with four distinct seasons featuring cold, somewhat snowy winters and warm, humid summers. Precipitation is moderate and consistent in all seasons, although summers are a bit wetter than winter due to the moisture from the Gulf of Mexico and the Great Lakes.

Demographics 

In 2015, the median household income in Newmarket was $95,589, exceeding the provincial average for the same year of $75,287.

According to the 2016 census, the town's population was 87,942. The York Region Planning Department projects a population of 98,000 by 2026. Newmarket's population density is just over 2000 inhabitants per square kilometre, ranking the census subdivision third in Ontario and 33rd in Canada.

In 2021, Newmarket was 63.9% white/European, 34.9% visible minorities, and 1.2% Indigenous. The largest visible minority groups (over 1000 population) were Chinese (10.0%), West Asian (6.5%), South Asian (4.3%), Black (2.9%), Southeast Asian (2.5%), Filipino (2.4%), and Latin American (1.5%).

English was the mother tongue of 64.2% of Newmarket residents in 2021. The next most common first languages were Chinese languages (7.5% including 4.7% Mandarin and 2.6% Cantonese), Persian (5.7%), Russian (2.7%), Italian (1.4%), Spanish (1.4%) Tagalog (1.1%), and French (1.0%). 3.2% of residents listed both English and a non-official language as mother tongues, while 0.4% listed both English and French.

50.6% of residents were Christian, down from 66.5% in 2011. 23.9% were Catholic, 12.2% were Protestant, 7.6% were Christian n.o.s, 4.2% were Christian Orthodox, and 2.7% belonged to other Christian denominations and Christian-related traditions. Non-religious or secular residents were 36.5% of the population, up from 25.4% in 2011. 12.9% of the population belonged to other religions and spiritual tradition, up from 8.1% in 2011. The largest non-Christian religions were Islam (6.5%), Buddhism (2.2%), Judaism (2.0%) and Hinduism (1.3%).

Economy 
Newmarket features a diverse and growing economy based largely in the business services, healthcare and knowledge sectors, as well as manufacturing and retail industries.

The following are some of the town's major public sector employers:
 Southlake Regional Health Centre
 Regional Municipality of York
 Town of Newmarket
 York Regional Police
 Royal Canadian Mounted Police "O" Division, Toronto North Headquarters
 Ontario Court of Justice / Ontario Superior Court of Justice
 York Region District School Board
 York Catholic District School Board
 Lake Simcoe Region Conservation Authority

The following are some of the town's major private sector employers:
 Celestica Inc.
 RNS Health Care Services
 TS Tech Canada Inc.
Bill Gosling Outsourcing
 Mars Canada Inc. (formerly known as Effem Inc.)
 Rockets Candy Company
 Exco Technologies
 Magna International
 Cintas
 BYD Company

As a result of this strong employment base both in Newmarket and York Region, 50% of Newmarket residents commute less than 30 minutes to work each day.

Arts and culture

Main Street Heritage Conservation District 

For over 100 years, the town's downtown area, centred around Main Street, has acted as a hub of commerce and cultural activity. This area contains numerous early 19th century buildings worthy of preservation, and in October 2013, this area was recognized as a Provincial Heritage Conservation District. This status serves to protect and officially recognize many of the heritage sites and buildings along this historic thoroughfare and its many side streets.

Recent investments have been made to improve the aesthetics and function of the historic area. These include:
 In 2003, Newmarket completed approximately $3 million of streetscape and infrastructure improvements along Main Street South.
 In 2010, construction began on the Davis Drive Rapidway. The project was finished in 2015. The buildings comprising the Union Hotel, dating from 1881, at the intersection of Main Street and Davis Drive were moved as an alternative to being demolished. 
 In 2011, an urban park called "Riverwalk Commons" was created east of Main Street South, north of Water Street at a cost of $10 million.
 In 2011, extensive renovations were completed to the Newmarket Community Centre & Lions Hall, located in the Riverwalk Commons.
 In 2016, extensive $10 million renovations were completed on Old Town Hall, off Main Street.

Architecture and heritage 

Numerous buildings and sites located in Newmarket possess a high degree of architectural and/or historical significance; most of these are concentrated in the historic Main Street area.  The following is a list of some of these sites; many of the below-listed buildings located along Main Street are within the Main Street Heritage Conservation District:

 Charles Hargrave Simpson Building, 184 Main Street South
 Wesley Block (origin of the 1837 Rebellion), 200 Main Street South
 Robert Simpson Store (first Simpson's Store in Canada), 226 Main Street South
 King George Hotel, 232 Main Street South
 Cawthra House, 262 Main Street South
 Roadhouse And Rose building, 157 Main Street South
 Charles E. Boyd Building, 240 Main Street South
 William N. Starr building, 189 Main Street South
 Old Newmarket Town Hall and Courthouse, 460 Botsford Street
 Canadian National Railway Building and former Station, 470 Davis Drive
 Christian Baptist Church, 135 Main Street South
 Doane House, 17100 Yonge Street
 Quaker Meeting House and Cemetery, 17030 Yonge Street
 Hicksite Cemetery, 16580 Yonge Street
 Elman W. Campbell Museum (formerly the North York Registry Office), 134 Main Street South
 Pioneer Burying Ground, Eagle Street
 Al Casale Ristorante (Rogers House), 17766 Leslie Street
 St. Andrew’s Presbyterian Church, 484 Water Street
 St. Paul’s Anglican Church and Rectory, 227 Church Street
 Trinity United Church, 461 Park Avenue
 Union Hotel, 425 Davis Drive - The two buildings comprising the Union Hotel were relocated to the back of the former site due to construction of the Davis Drive Rapidway In 2018, the buildings were designated under the Ontario Heritage Act.

Theatre 
 The NewRoads Performing Arts Centre (formerly the Newmarket Theatre) is the largest performing arts theatre in the town, with a capacity of 400. It hosts a selection of world-class artists and local performing arts events annually. The NewRoads Performing Arts Centre is operated by the Town of Newmarket.
 Old Town Hall has hosted organized theatre and performing arts for over 100 years, and in March 2012 the Town of Newmarket announced that a formal 250-seat theatre would be included as part of its revitalization. Construction on this initiative started in 2013 and was completed in 2016.

Coat of arms

Newmarket's coat of arms is actually taken from the town's old corporate seal. The town flag is a navy blue field with this same design in the middle. The beehive and bees are said to represent industry. There are nine bees, representing the town's nine most prominent businesses at the time that Newmarket was incorporated as a Village. The latest form of the seal was introduced in 1938 with the arms somewhat altered from – but very similar in concept to – one that was earlier used. The arms' origin is something of a mystery, however. It is unknown what artist created the current version – or indeed the earlier version – and the town has no official record as to the purchase or redesign of the arms.

Sports

Hockey 
Newmarket was previously home to the following teams:
 Newmarket Hurricanes from 1987 to 2019, an Ontario Provincial Junior A Hockey League. The franchise was moved to Milton, Ontario and renamed to the Milton Menace.
 Newmarket Saints from 1986 to 1991, an American Hockey League franchise and farm team of the Toronto Maple Leafs who moved from St. Catharines. The franchise was later moved to St. John's, Newfoundland and became the St. John's Maple Leafs.
 Newmarket Royals from 1992 to 1994. This was a franchise of the Ontario Hockey League who were previously the Cornwall Royals and in 1994 moved again to become the Sarnia Sting.
 Newmarket Flyers from 1975 to 1986, OPJHL Jr. A (formerly The Seneca Flyers).
 Newmarket Redmen from late 1920s to 1972 Jr. B.

Junior Leagues
Newmarket is also home to many rep and select teams. They go by the name of the Newmarket Renegades and range from divisions of Tyke to Midget.

Golf 
One golf course is located within Newmarket's town limits; St. Andrew's Valley (a public club), which straddles the Aurora/Newmarket border. Glenway Country Club was a private club with a course within Newmarket's boundaries, but it was closed before the 2012 season and is being redeveloped for housing.

There are also several courses in the surrounding communities and countryside.

Swimming 
Three public swimming places exist throughout Newmarket: Ray Twinney Complex, Gorman Pool, which is open only in the summer, and the Magna Centre.

Curling 
Newmarket is home to the York Curling Club.

Government

Mayor and Council 
John Taylor was elected in October 2018 to become mayor, succeeding Tony Van Bynen who was mayor from 2006 to 2018. (See list of previous mayors)

The town's council includes a mayor, seven councillors elected on the basis of one per ward, and a regional councillor who is elected to join the mayor at meetings of York Regional Council. The members of council elected in 2018 are:

Mayor: John Taylor

Deputy Mayor & Regional Councillor: Tom Vegh

Councillors:

 Ward 1: Grace Simon
 Ward 2: Victor Woodhouse
 Ward 3: Jane Twinney
 Ward 4: Trevor Morrison
 Ward 5: Bob Kwapis
 Ward 6: Kelly Broome
 Ward 7: Christina Bisanz

Provincially, Newmarket is part of the riding of Newmarket—Aurora represented by Dawn Gallagher Murphy, a member of the PC Party of Ontario, and elected in 2022 general election. The province realigned its ridings to match those of the federal government in 2004.

Federally, Newmarket is part of the riding of federal riding of Newmarket—Aurora. The riding is represented in the House of Commons of Canada by Tony Van Bynen, a member of the Liberal Party of Canada, who was first elected in 2019 genenral election.

Town Offices 
The town offices are located at 395 Mulock Drive, which is the fourth location for the offices. Purchased as an abandoned factory in 1995, it was opened in 1996. The location was found after years of unsuccessful attempts to purchase the Tannery Mall (465 Davis Drive) or Office Specialty Factory (near 543 Timothy Street c.1912 and now mostly demolished).

Prior to 1996, the town offices were located a various temporary locations:

 King George Hotel - 234 Main Street South (corner of Timothy and Main Streets) and was built in 1825 Now commercial building.
 Town Hall and Registry Offices - 140 Main Street South at northwest corner of Main Street South and Millard Street 1863-1942. Council met above fire hall. Town Clerk office and Fire Hall were demolished and now home to Old Flame Brewing Company. Registry Building next door is now a museum.
 Widdfield Building - Main Street South and Botsford Streets was formerly an Imperial Bank of Canada branch. Used from 1942 to 1952 (or 1959?) and now home to cafe.
 171 Main Street South - moved here in 1981 and remained until 1996. Building was acquired in 1950. Now 171 Main Street South Professional Building.

Police
The York Regional Police is the primary police agency in Newmarket. Ontario Provincial Police patrol on provincially maintained highways in Newmarket like Highway 404.

The Royal Canadian Mounted Police North Toronto Detachment is located in Newmarket.

Infrastructure

Transportation 
Newmarket is connected to Toronto by highways. It is served by two interchanges (Davis Drive, as well as Vivian Road / Mulock Drive) along Highway 404 and connected to Highway 400 via Highway 9.

Local public transit is provided by York Region Transit, which operates the Viva Blue bus rapid transit route from the Newmarket Bus Terminal to the Finch Bus Terminal in Toronto. YRT/VIVA has built the Davis Drive Rapidway along Davis Drive between Yonge Street and Southlake Regional Health Centre, with fully separated bus only lanes and centre street station platforms for their Viva Yellow service. The bus travels in mixed traffic between Southlake Regional Health Centre and Highway 404. The project was completed on November 29, 2015.

Commuter rail is provided by GO Transit through the Newmarket GO Station with service south to Toronto and north to Barrie, with five trains each direction during rush hour. Regular bus service is also operated by GO Transit, with service operating between 5am and 2am.

The town has many trails, the most useful of which is the Tom Taylor, which extends from the border of Aurora on St. John's side-road all the way north through downtown and down into Holland Landing in the Town of East Gwillimbury.

Library
Located in the historic Downtown area, the Newmarket Public Library provides residents with free access to 175,000 items, including books, audio books, magazines, multilingual materials, DVDs, CDs, video games, e-books and online databases. The library also runs the York Info service, which provides information about local organizations, groups and services, and helps develop a stronger volunteer presence in the community by connecting people who would like to volunteer with non-profit agencies looking for assistance. The library also produces a quarterly newsletter called "Off the Shelf" to inform patrons of its programs, services and events. The library is a founding member of the Shared Digital Infrastructure project, an initiative to plan for an Intelligent Community in Newmarket.

Education 
Public elementary and secondary education in Newmarket is overseen by York Region's two school boards: the York Region District School Board (YRDSB), and the York Catholic District School Board (YCDSB).

The YRDSB operates four secondary schools in Newmarket: Dr. John M. Denison Secondary School, Huron Heights Secondary School, Newmarket High School, and Sir William Mulock Secondary School, in addition to 15 elementary schools.

The YCDSB operates one secondary school in the town: Sacred Heart Catholic High School, and six elementary schools. There is also a Christian private elementary school, Newmarket District Christian Academy (NDCA), and a private Christian academy, Innova Academy.

Newmarket is also the home of Pickering College, an independent day and boarding school, as well as a campus of Seneca College.

Media

Print 
Newmarket is within the coverage area of all major Toronto publications/newspapers.

Local print media is provided by The Newmarket Era (formerly the Era Banner), founded in 1852 when English immigrant printer G.S. Porter first published The New Era in Newmarket. Today, it is published twice a week (on Thursdays and Sundays).

Radio 
Newmarket is also well served by radio stations from Toronto.

Newmarket is also the town of licence for 88.5 CKDX-FM.  Originally launched on February 28, 1980 as 1480 CKAN.  Its studios were located in the Newmarket Plaza then relocated to the Tannery.  The studios are currently located in Toronto with the transmitter located in King Township west of Newmarket/Aurora.

Notable people 

 John Candy, comedian/actor
 Jim Carrey, comedian/actor
 Munro Chambers, actor
 Frances Champagne, professor, neuroscientist
 Vince Corazza, actor 
 Florence Shirley Patterson Jones, astronomer
 H.R. MacMillan, CBE, C.C., forestry specialist and industrialist, wartime administrator, philanthropist
 William Mulock, former Cabinet Minister and Chief Justice of the Supreme Court of Ontario
 Mazo de la Roche, author of the Jalna series
 Belinda Stronach, businesswoman, philanthropist, and former politician

Music 
 Clarknova, alternative rock band
 The Elwins, rock band
 Hannah Georgas, pop singer
 Glass Tiger, rock band
 Lorne Lofsky, jazz guitarist
 Alexander Muir, composer of The Maple Leaf Forever
 Steven Lee Olsen, country musician
 The Salads, punk rock band
 Serial Joe, rock band
 Tyler Stewart, drummer for Barenaked Ladies
 Tokyo Police Club, rock band
 Tim Oxford, drummer for Arkells

Sports 

Hockey
 Darren Archibald, AHL hockey player with the Belleville Senators
 Quinton Byfield, NHL hockey player for the Los Angeles Kings
 Herb Cain, former NHL hockey player, 1944 NHL scoring champion
 Daniel Catenacci, former NHL hockey player (Buffalo and NY Rangers)
 Dit Clapper, Hall of Fame hockey player
 B. J. Crombeen, former NHL hockey player
 Travis Dermott, NHL hockey player for the Vancouver Canucks
 Steve Downie, former NHL hockey player
 Brian Elliott, goaltender for the Tampa Bay Lightning of the NHL
 Kurtis Gabriel, former NHL hockey player
 Wes Jarvis, former AHL and NHL hockey player; former head coach of the Newmarket Hurricanes of the OPJHL; assistant coach with the Barrie Colts
 Mike Kitchen, former head coach for the St. Louis Blues
 Corey Locke, AHL hockey player and NHL draft pick
 Chuck Luksa, former WHA hockey player with Cincinnati Stingers
 Jamie Macoun, former NHL hockey player
 Connor McDavid, NHL hockey player for the Edmonton Oilers
 Joe Murphy, member of the 1990 Stanley Cup champion Edmonton Oilers
 Shayne Stevenson, former NHL player (Boston Bruins and Tampa Bay Lightning)
 Bill Thoms, former NHL star for the Toronto Maple Leafs, Chicago Black Hawks and Boston Bruins
 Rob Zepp, former hockey player in Europe and the NHL (Philadelphia Flyers)

Soccer
 Jim Brennan, Canada men's national soccer team member, first player signed to Toronto FC soccer club
 Marcel de Jong, Dutch-Canadian soccer player for Pacific FC

Other
 Gabrielle Daleman, figure skater
 Michelle Long, figure skater
 Scott Goodyear, Indycar racing driver
 Neil Harrison, curler
 Carlos Newton, former UFC Welterweight Champion; trainer/teacher at Warrior Martial Arts
 Pete Orr, Olympic baseball player and former Philadelphia Phillies infielder
 Kevin Pangos, basketball player at Gonzaga University and Canada youth international
 Sheila Reid, Olympic cross country runner
 Lindsay Seemann, swimmer; 200m Backstroke, 2008 Olympics, Beijing, China
 Elvis Stojko, figure skater

References

External links 

 

 
Lower-tier municipalities in Ontario
Towns in Ontario